Coriobacterium is a genus of Actinomycetota, in the family Coriobacteriaceae. Coriobacterium are non-motile, Gram-positive, non-sporulating rods, which inhabit the gastrointestinal tract of firebugs (Pyrrhocoris apterus). Up to now there is only on species of this genus known (Coriobacterium glomerans)

See also
Bifidobacterium—a similar genus of bacteria.

References

Coriobacteriaceae
Monotypic bacteria genera
Bacteria genera